Bradden is a village and civil parish in West Northamptonshire, England, about  west of Towcester. According to the 2001 census it had a population of 179, falling to 149 at the 2011 census.

The villages name means 'broad valley'.

Buildings
The Parish Church is dedicated to St Michael and is 13th century.

There is a Manor House dated 1819 but there was an earlier pre-Reformation house before and the front looks earlier than 1819.

References

External links

Villages in Northamptonshire
West Northamptonshire District
Civil parishes in Northamptonshire